Lysine-specific demethylase 2A (KDM2A) also known as F-box and leucine-rich repeat protein 11 (FBXL11) is an enzyme that in humans is encoded by the KDM2A gene. KDM2A is a member of the superfamily of alpha-ketoglutarate-dependent hydroxylases, which are non-haem iron-containing proteins.

Function 

This gene encodes a member of the F-box protein family which is characterized by an approximately 40 amino acid motif, the F-box. The F-box proteins constitute one of the four subunits of ubiquitin protein ligase complex called SCFs (SKP1-cullin-F-box), which function in phosphorylation-dependent ubiquitination. The F-box proteins are divided into 3 classes: Fbws containing WD-40 domains, Fbls containing leucine-rich repeats, and Fbxs containing either different protein-protein interaction modules or no recognizable motifs. The protein encoded by this gene belongs to the Fbls class and, in addition to an F-box, contains at least 6 highly degenerated leucine-rich repeats.

FBXL11/KDM2A is a histone H3 lysine 36 demethylase enzyme. The enzymatic activity of FBXL11/KDM2A relies on a conserved JmjC domain in the N-terminus of the protein that co-ordinates iron and alphaketoglutarate to catalyze demethylation via a hydroxylation based mechanism. It has recently been demonstrated that a ZF-CxxC DNA binding domain within FBXL11/KDM2A has the capacity to interact with non-methylated DNA and this domain targets FBXL11/KDM2A to CpG island regions of the genome where it specifically removes histone H3 lysine 36 methylation. This mechanism acts to create a chromatin environment at CpG islands that highlights these regulatory elements and differentiates them from non-regulatory regions in large complex mammalian genomes. In a study in mouse hepatocytes, this gene was shown to regulate hepatic gluconeogenesis.

References

Further reading

Human 2OG oxygenases
EC 1.14.11